Gatlin O'Donkor (born 14 October 2004) is an English footballer who plays for Oxford United, as a forward.

Career
O'Donkor set the record for the youngest ever Oxford United player at the age of 16 years and 55 days when he made his debut on 8 December 2020 in an EFL Trophy tie against Forest Green Rovers. After the match was drawn 1–1, he scored Oxford United's opening penalty in the penalty shoot-out as they won 4–1 on penalties.

On 5 March 2022, O'Donkor joined National League South side Oxford City on an initial one-month loan deal. He made his debut that day, scoring the third in a 5–0 defeat of Tonbridge Angels. He returned to his parent club and made his league debut for Oxford United as a second-half substitute in the last game of the 2021–22 season, a 1–1 draw with Doncaster Rovers, on 30 April 2022. He signed his first professional contract with the club in August 2022. His first senior start came in a 2nd-round EFL Cup defeat to Crystal Palace on 23 August 2022, and his first League start in a 2–1 home victory over Burton Albion on 3 September 2022. He scored his first senior goal for the club having come on as a half-time substitute in a League One fixture against Fleetwood Town on 1 November 2022; the game ended in a 1–1 draw.

Personal life
Born in England, O'Donkor is of Ghanaian descent.

Career statistics
.

References

External links
 

2004 births
Living people
English footballers
English sportspeople of Ghanaian descent
Association football forwards
Oxford United F.C. players
Oxford City F.C. players
National League (English football) players